The name house spider is a generic term for  11 different spiders commonly found around human dwellings, and may refer to their common name:

 Yellow sac spider, Chiracanthium inclusum, a common house spider worldwide.
 Black house spider, Badumna Insignis, an Australian spider also found in New Zealand; 
 Brown house spider, Steatoda grossa, a spider with cosmopolitan distribution; 
 American  house spider, Parasteatoda tepidariorum, a cobweb spider; 
 Cellar spider, of the family Pholcidae, also known as daddy long-legs in North America; 
 Domestic house spider, Tegenaria domestica, also known as barn weaver in North America; 
 Giant house spider, Eratigena atrica (formerly Tegenaria gigantea); 
 Hobo spider, Eratigena agrestis (sometimes called aggressive house spider); 
Geometric House Spider or House button spider, Latrodectus Geometricus (more commonly known as the brown widow);
 Southern house spider, Kukulcania hibernalis 
 Tiny house spider, Oonops domesticus

Disambiguation gallery

Arthropod common names
Former disambiguation pages converted to set index articles